Anna Barbaro (born 27 March 1985) is an Italian Paralympic triathlete. She won silver, with her guide Charlotte Bonin, in the Women's PTVI in Tokyo on 28 August 2021.

References

External links
 Anna Barbaro  at Olympics.com

Paralympic athletes of Fiamme Azzurre
Living people
1985 births
Paratriathletes at the 2020 Summer Paralympics
Medalists at the 2020 Summer Paralympics
Paralympic silver medalists for Italy